Amila Eranga (full name Amila Eranga Witharana; born 23 September 1986) is a Sri Lankan cricketer. He is a right-handed batsman and leg-break bowler who plays for Sebastianites. He was born in Matara.

Eranga played for Kalutara Town Club's Under-23s team during the 2007 season, and in the 2008 season moved to the Sebastianites' team.

Eranga made his first-class debut in the 2008–09 season, against Lankan Cricket Club. From the opening order, he scored 2 runs in the first innings in which he batted, and 15 runs in the second.
He is now living in Australia, Melbourne

External links
Amila Eranga at Cricket Archive 

1986 births
Living people
Sri Lankan cricketers
Sebastianites Cricket and Athletic Club cricketers